Andre Walker (born August 19, 1956 in Chicago, Illinois) is a hairstylist from the United States who has won seven Daytime Emmy Awards for Outstanding Achievement in Hairstyling for his work on The Oprah Winfrey Show. He is best known for being the personal hairstylist of Oprah Winfrey and for creating Halle Berry's signature short pixie haircut. Other celebrity clients of Walker's have included Barbara Bush and Michelle Obama.

After graduating from the Pivot Point Academy, Walker began working as a hairstylist and opened his own salon in downtown Chicago. In 1986, after watching The Oprah Winfrey Show, he wrote to Oprah offering to help style her hair. She responded and took up his offer, and he soon became her personal hairstylist.

For his work on The Oprah Winfrey Show, Walker won the Daytime Emmy Award for Outstanding Achievement in Hairstyling seven times in 1989, 1990, 1993, 1994, 1996, 1997 and 2003. He was also nominated for this award a further seven times (in 1987, 1988, 1998, 1999, 2004, 2005 and 2006). In 2008, Pivot Point International awarded Walker its inaugural L.E.O. Award, named for Pivot Point founder Leo Passage. Walker thanked Pivot Point for encouraging him to “do almost anything” in the field of hair design. Walker received the Thurgood Marshall Fashion Icon Award in 2009.

In the 1990s, he created the Andre Walker Hair Typing System to market his line of hair care products, which has since been widely adopted as a hair type classification system.

References

External links
 andrewalkerhair.com 
 

Living people
1956 births
African-American businesspeople
American hairdressers
Businesspeople from Chicago
Daytime Emmy Award winners
21st-century African-American people
20th-century African-American people